The Dancer may refer to:

 The Dancer (1915 film), a German silent drama film
 The Dancer (1919 film), a German silent film
 The Dancer (2000 film), an English-language French drama film
 The Dancer (2011 film), an Indonesian film
 The Dancer (2016 film), a French biographical historical drama film

See also
 Dance (disambiguation)
 Dancer (disambiguation)
 The Dancers (disambiguation)